Yassen Taalat  is a Canadian recording artist and song writer born in Sudbury now based in Toronto.  He is the co-founder and lead singer of the popular gold selling status band Project Wyze and currently the successful hip hop group Dead Celebrity Status. Yas had been making music and performing since the early age of 13 and toured with hip hop group Public Enemy by the time he was 14 years of age.  Yas and band partner Bobby made a name for themselves across North America as gifted lyricists and ferocious battle emcee's.  Though born in Canada his parents hail from Morocco.  He is Muslim and talks about the pains and struggles of being one in this post 9/11 world on the Dead Celebrity Status track "In This Day and Age" featuring Jeordie White aka Twiggy Ramirez from Marilyn Manson and Bif Naked.

Taalat has worked and collaborated with many successful artists such as Dave Navarro and Stephen Perkins from Jane's Addiction, Grammy nominated singer Joss Stone, Twiggy Ramirez from Marilyn Manson, Bif Naked, Swollen Members, DJ Lethal of Limp Bizkit and House of Pain and New York City emcee Cage.  
Making music and performing since he was 13 years old, he has graced the stage with some of the world biggest and best artists like Ozzy Osbourne, Tool, De La Soul, Blink 182, Marilyn Manson, Public Enemy, Sum 41, Jurassic 5, Tech N9ne, Gym Class Heroes, AFI, Linkin Park, Good Charlotte, E-40 and Papa Roach to name a few.  As well as taking part in some of the biggest music festival in North America The Vans Warped Tour, Ozzfest and Edgefest and touring all over Europe.  Dead Celebrity Status are known for their explosive and adrenaline fused live show and labeled by MTV as "pound for pound one of the best live performances in the business".  Taalat can be found leaping into the crowd, body surfing and moshing throughout the show.

Taalat is also a regular judge at King of the Dot (KOTD) battles.

Taalat was quoted in an interview that he had completed many screenplays and looks forward to directing a feature film in the future.  Pursuing a film career is definitely in the works as both writer and director. Taalat is a huge movie fan. He has watched The Karate Kid over 100 times, including multiple different languages and even once on mute. He is also an avid basketball fan and can be found during the NBA season at the Air Canada Centre cheering on his Toronto Raptors where he is a longtime season ticket holder. Taalat's favourite player is Reggie Miller of the Indiana Pacers. He has been Taalat's idol his entire life.

References

Year of birth missing (living people)
Living people
Musicians from Greater Sudbury
Musicians from Toronto
Canadian Muslims
20th-century Canadian rappers
21st-century Canadian rappers
Canadian male rappers
Nu metal singers
20th-century Canadian male musicians
21st-century Canadian male musicians